Salanter Akiba Riverdale High School (SAR High School) is an Open Orthodox Jewish day school located in Riverdale, New York City. It was founded in 2003 by Rabbi Naftali (Tully) Harcsztark. The school is affiliated with SAR Academy, which is also in Riverdale.

The high school's founding and current principal is Rabbi Tully Harcsztark. In fall 2019, previous assistant principal Rabbi Jonathan Kroll, returned to the school to serve as its Co-Principal.

As of the 2017–18 school year, the school had an enrollment of 539 students and 121.0 classroom teachers (on an FTE basis), for a student–teacher ratio of 4.45:1.

Extracurricular activities
Students have the opportunity to contribute to a wide variety of publications including Ruach Searah, the Dvar Torah newsletter; 'SAR Broadcasting club'where students learn how to work cameras how to setup a broadcasting setup and broadcast sting/games played at the school. The Buzz, the official school newspaper; The Science Journal; Math Mag, an award-winning publication;  the literary journal, Euphrates; The Israel Activism Committee's HaOketz covering Israel current events; "House Divided," the first student run publication dedicated to political and historical dialogue; SARcasm, the school satire magazine, and the Global Awareness and Action Committee's (GAAC) publication. Clubs include Model United Nations, Debate, Mock Trial, College Bowl, and countless others. SAR also has many charity clubs, including the Cookies For A Cause Club, which has won multiple grants and awards, including the Optimum Charity Champions grant in 2015. In 2019, SAR's Economics Club won the National Championships in the Personal Finance Challenge, beating over 18,000 other students nationwide.

In February 2021, The EPG (elections, politics, and governance) club held a town hall for the New York City mayoral election. Several candidates, including Andrew Yang, Eric Adams, and Maya Wiley, were in attendance.

Sports
All of SAR's teams are members of the Metropolitan Yeshiva High School Athletic League, which is composed of many of the Jewish day schools throughout the New York metropolitan area.

SAR teams compete in baseball, softball, hockey, soccer, Swim, volleyball, basketball, track, tennis, and wrestling.

SAR's College Bowl team was featured in the 2012–2013 season of MSG Varsity's the Challenge. They were the Bronx/Brooklyn champions but lost in the following round.
SAR also has a Fencing Team that competes once a year with other Jewish day schools.

Controversies
In 2013, SAR High School made news by allowing female students to put on tefillin during morning prayers, becoming the first Modern Orthodox school to do so. This decision was generally supported by most; however it did cause the school to receive significant backlash from the more traditional community.

External Links 
SAR High School Home Page

References 

Educational institutions established in 2003
Private high schools in the Bronx
Modern Orthodox Jewish day schools in the United States
Riverdale, Bronx
2003 establishments in New York City